Thomas Todd Manning is a fictional character from the American daytime drama One Life to Live (OLTL).  Created by writers Michael Malone and Josh Griffith, the role was originated in 1992 by actor Roger Howarth. Todd was a college student and fraternity brother to Kevin Buchanan, Zach Rosen, and Powell Lord. In 1993, following a storyline in which he becomes acquainted with Marty Saybrooke, he initiates a gang rape on her with the help of Zach and Powell. The storyline was considered groundbreaking by television critics. Its main players—Howarth, Susan Haskell (Marty), and Hillary B. Smith (Todd's lawyer Nora Hanen)—won Emmys in 1994, as did Malone and his writing team. Howarth left the role in 2003; it was recast with Trevor St. John, physically altered by plastic surgery. In 2011, Howarth returned to OLTL; it was disclosed Todd had been taken hostage and St. John's version of the character was really Todd's identical twin brother, Victor Lord, Jr., conditioned to assume Todd's place.

Todd was initially a short-term villain, but his popularity with the audience and critics inspired the writers to forgo killing him or permanently sending him to prison, like most soap operas had done with rapists in the past. While keeping aspects of his personality dark or violent, they had Todd exhibit a conscience and compassion. They took steps to redeem him and made him an integral part of OLTL canvas, despite Howarth's objections to a redemption storyline. With the use of literary techniques for the redemptive arc, the writers borrowed from nineteenth-century melodrama and Gothic traditions, and literature such as Frankenstein. Todd became the product of an affair between his father, Victor Lord, and his mother, Irene Manning, which provided him a fortune and ties to other major characters, including his sisters, Tina and Victoria Lord. An important aspect of the character became his appearance, most notably the scar on his right cheek, which emerged as synonymous with him and served to remind him of his past misdeeds against Marty. Music and the use of humor were also key to Todd's development. Although he formed many relationships (including with his wives, Blair Cramer and Téa Delgado), and fathered children, a defining characteristic of his personality was his resistance to close relationships and sexual intimacy.

The drive to redeem Todd eventually drew Howarth, who always saw Todd as a villain, to leave the show for a year; he was uncomfortable with the redemption storyline and with many fans' positive reactions to Todd. Recasting Todd years later with St. John was generally considered successful by viewers and critics. St. John, instead of imitating Howarth's portrayal, brought his own spin to the character.  After OLTL cancellation in 2012, Howarth brought Todd to General Hospital (GH), but returned, along with St. John as Victor Jr., to the online version of OLTL in 2013, which was cancelled after one year.

Todd has been the subject of numerous soap opera articles, feminist studies, and inspired the creation of a doll in his likeness. He has remained a popular and controversial figure since his creation, and is considered one of soap opera's breakout characters.

Storylines

1992–2003 

In 1992, Todd, a defensive back for Llanview, Pennsylvania University's football team, has a one-night stand with Marty Saybrooke (Susan Haskell), a wild child. After she tutors him for a calculus exam and he fails it, which results in him getting suspended from the football team, he blames her. In 1993, Todd and his fraternity brothers, Zach Rosen and Powell Lord, rape Marty in Kevin's dorm room. Todd hires attorney Nora Hanen (Hillary B. Smith), who believes in his innocence until a woman named Carol Swift reveals Todd also raped her; Nora causes a mistrial. Todd continues to torment Marty, including by attempting to rape her for a second time, but she eventually tricks Todd into confessing, sending him, Zach and Powell to prison. Per Marty's testimony that Powell, who was peer pressured into raping her, is remorseful, Powell receives a lighter sentence (one year with the possibility of parole in three months to Todd and Zach's eight years with the possibility of parole in four years). This spurs on Todd's need for revenge. While in prison, he befriends Rebecca Lewis (Reiko Aylesworth) and attends counseling sessions. Todd and Rebecca develop romantic feelings for each other, and Todd convinces Rebecca to help him escape prison. He is stabbed in the chest with a pair of scissors by Nora when he goes after her for revenge. Officer Bo Buchanan (Robert S. Woods), Nora's love interest, rescues her from Todd. The two fight, but Todd escapes. In hiding, he is discovered by Marty and her boyfriend, Suede Pruitt. After accidentally killing Suede when they fight, he is shot by Bo; Todd falls into the Llantano River, and is presumed dead.

Todd survives and hides at Llanfair, where he befriends two children, C. J. and Sarah Roberts. He is arrested when he jealously confronts new couple Rebecca and Powell. His prison van gets into an accident with another vehicle, and he rescues Marty, C. J. and Jessica (Erin Torpey) from the car. This results in an early parole for Todd, but he continues to seek counseling. He is later accused of rape by several women. Marty reluctantly provides him with an alibi for one of the attacks. A deranged Powell, believing Todd is in his head, is later revealed as the serial rapist and kidnaps Rebecca. When Todd confronts him, making it so that Rebecca can escape, he kidnaps Todd and makes Todd feel the way Marty felt when they raped her. Todd proceeds to overpower Powell. After Powell is caught and arrested, Todd apologizes to Marty for all the pain he caused her, recognizing that he "was a monster." He begins falling in love with Blair Cramer (Kassie DePaiva) after meeting her in a bar. In December 1994, Peter Manning dies and Todd learns he is adopted. Conman David Vickers (Tuc Watkins) discovers Todd's biological parents, Victor Lord and Irene Manning. With help from Todd's scheming biological sister, Tina, David claims to be the lost Lord heir, but Todd's true parentage is ultimately revealed, leaving Todd $27.8 million richer. He purchases a tabloid paper from Dorian Lord (Robin Strasser) and relaunches it as The Sun, a direct rival to his new-found family's newspaper The Banner. In 1995, Blair tricks Todd into marriage by faking a pregnancy. She later learns that she really is pregnant, but, after being mugged, she miscarries. Todd discovers she initially lied about her pregnancy and has the marriage annulled. When Blair becomes pregnant again, they remarry in November 1995. Although they are happy, Blair dislikes Todd's consistent concern for Marty. He goes to Ireland to give Marty a flight back to Llanview. Her friend, Patrick Thornhart (Thorsten Kaye), is being hunted by Irish terrorists. Todd poses as Patrick, is shot, and presumed dead. Blair blames Marty. Todd returns to Llanview in 1996, to find Blair in bed with Patrick. His sister, Victoria "Viki" Lord (Erika Slezak), introduces him to his daughter, Starr (Kristen Alderson). Todd eventually resumes his life with Blair. They have many difficulties in their marriage, and Starr being diagnosed with aplastic anemia strains the marriage further. 

Blair is pregnant with Patrick's baby, who has been identified as a donor match for Starr. She gives birth to his stillborn son in 1997. Todd blames Patrick for the miscarriage and frames him for the murder of billionaire and Llanview newcomer Guy Armitage. Blair learns that Todd caused the explosion that killed Guy, and divorces him in June. When Blair falls into a coma, Todd pays lawyer Téa Delgado (Florencia Lozano) five million dollars to marry him so he can keep custody of Starr. When Blair awakens, he allows Blair visitation. In 1998, while Todd and Téa grow closer, Todd is again accused of rape; Blair and Sam Rappaport (Kale Browne), a lawyer and father-figure to Todd, help prove his innocence. Back in town upon Todd's request, he also intends to help Todd save his tempestuous marriage to Téa. In the interim, Todd and Blair grow closer, and Blair and Téa vie for Todd's affections. As Todd and Téa fall in love, Blair moves on with Sam. When Todd is about to be arrested for the murder of a woman named Georgie Phillips, he takes the other fourteen suspects hostage at the Buchanan family cabin with fake dynamite strapped to his chest. Rachel Gannon admits to the murder, but Todd is arrested for the hostage incident. He fakes dissociative identity disorder (split personalities) to avoid conviction and keep Téa in his life. Téa divorces him as part of his defense strategy, but they remarry in November. During the reception, a tape on which Todd confesses to faking his split personalities is accidentally played at Starr's request. Téa refuses his offer of another five million to stay married to him. He leaves town in December, and Tea has the marriage annulled in 1999.

In 2000, Todd keeps tabs on Téa, who starts dating Rachel's uncle, R. J. (Timothy Stickney). Out of jealousy, he almost kills R. J. via a gunshot, and reveals himself to Téa, convincing her to leave town with him. When Téa dumps him, he returns months later without her. Todd and Blair grow close again. By framing Skye Chandler (Robin Christopher), he helps her cover up her rage-shooting of Max Holden (James DePaiva). They decide to remarry, but the night before the wedding, a vengeful Max drugs Blair and leads Todd to believe they had sex. A furious Todd exposes Blair as Max's shooter. After burying Max alive to discover the truth, and soon afterward releasing him, he helps Blair stay out of jail by claiming she suffered a psychotic break. She is committed against her will. Months later, she goes to Mexico, knowing that she is pregnant with Todd's child. Todd follows, where he delivers their son. Believing the child is Max's, he gives the baby to David Vickers, and lets Blair think the baby died and was cremated soon afterward. During her grief, she and Todd reconcile, and she finally tells Todd that the child was really his. Todd locates the infant and claims the boy was abandoned. Blair subsequently believes the child is a stranger. In December 2001, Todd convinces Blair to remarry him. They name their son John "Jack" Cramer Manning, and Todd makes it appear they have adopted him.

Jack develops aplastic anemia like Starr. This ultimately leads Sam to deduce that they are biological siblings, and to inform Blair that Jack is her biological son. She angrily confronts Todd. When he admits that he gave Jack away and forced her to grieve for a child that was never dead, she classifies his existence as worthless and bans him from her life, which results in him being severely emotionally unstable. Blair leaves town with the children, but Todd follows her to Hawaii, where his plans to kidnap the children with help from Ross Rayburn (Shawn Christian) are foiled by Téa. Todd and Téa make love when they get stranded together on an island with Ross. Todd escapes to return to Blair, and protects her when the Mafia comes after her because of her exposé on them in The Sun. As Todd and Blair are about to remarry, Sam discloses that Todd, in an effort to win Blair's affections, staged a hit on their nanny, who had been presumed dead as a result of the Mafia's retaliation. Todd had used the nanny's "death" as an excuse for Blair to stay with him, later staging a hit on Blair's life, with him as the rescuer. The wedding is called off, and Blair distances herself from Todd. Soon afterward, Mitch Laurence (Roscoe Born) kidnaps Starr. Blair exchanges her own life for her daughter's. Todd rescues Blair by kidnapping his niece, Natalie (Melissa Archer), and exchanging her life for Blair's. Mitch, working for the presumed dead Victor Lord, intends to steal a descendant's heart so he can live. Natalie is rescued, and Todd comes face to face with a frail Victor before he finally dies from heart failure. Mitch kidnaps Todd and locks him in Victor's crypt in order to frame him for Sam Rappaport's murder. Todd disappears from the crypt, and Blair eventually has him declared dead.

2011–2013
Todd's identical twin brother, Victor Lord, Jr. (Trevor St. John), whom he had never known, is physically altered and brainwashed to believe that he is Todd. From May 2003 to August 2011, he assumes Todd's identity. In 2003, the presumed dead Irene Manning had ordered a hit on the real Todd to keep him from exposing her agency. She had Todd strapped to a chair and made him uncover every detail of his life. She originally gave Victor Todd's scar, but then had Victor's face altered with reconstructive surgery to make him look like Mitch Laurence's long lost brother, Flynn Walker Laurence. Irene sent Victor away in Todd's place, so that he could get his share of the inheritance as Victor Lord Sr.'s heir, and unknowingly help the agency. She kept the real Todd locked up, instead of following through with the original plan to kill him. She eventually admits to these facts after Todd escapes and returns home. Todd struggles with losing eight years of his life, and blames Victor for stealing his children, including the daughter he had with Téa, Danielle (Dani). He plans to kill Victor and is the top suspect when Victor is gunned down. He claims his innocence and convinces Starr to help him escape jail to keep Irene from killing the family for Victor's fortune. Although Irene wounds him, Todd kills her. Téa's brother, Tomás (Ted King), takes credit for allowing a wounded Todd to escape. Todd begins having vivid memories of killing Victor. Before Tomás is sentenced, Todd confesses to Irene's murder; Téa gets the charges reduced to self-defense. Todd locates the gun used to kill Victor and uses it to frame Tomás as revenge for initially bringing him to Irene. Todd and a rogue CIA agent force Tomás into a false confession. Todd faces difficulty bonding with Jack, who only accepts Victor as his father, but he continues to bond with Starr and assists her with various issues. He also helps Cole Thornhart fake his death so he can live with Starr and their daughter, Hope, in California. Todd is later arrested for Victor's murder.

In 2012, Todd jumps bail and arrives in Port Charles upon learning that Starr has been involved in a car accident that resulted in the deaths of Cole and Hope. Todd thinks local mobster Sonny Corinthos (Maurice Benard) is responsible for the deaths and seeks revenge. The charges against him for Victor's murder are dropped, due to a claim of posttraumatic stress disorder (PTSD) following his years in captivity, but Starr faces attempted murder charges for trying to kill Sonny. A pregnant Téa, who has been sought out by Blair to represent Starr, gets the charges dropped. In June, Todd is with Téa during an intense rainstorm when she goes into labor and gives birth to an unresponsive baby boy. Sam Morgan (Kelly Monaco) is also giving birth to a baby boy in a motel room. After Todd, searching for help, comes upon Heather Webber (Robin Mattson) in a shack, and she tells Todd that Téa's baby has died, he comes across Sam's son. An elated Téa sees the child and believes he is hers. Todd allows Téa to believe the child is hers, after Heather talks him out of telling Téa the truth. Todd forms a close relationship with Carly Corinthos (Laura Wright), Sonny's former wife, in the wake of yet another rejection from Blair, who is set to marry Tomás. Todd's role in the baby switch is eventually revealed. To make amends for almost killing her son, Steven, Heather lies to the judge and prosecutors about Todd's role in switching the babies. He is then released.

In 2013, Todd returns to Llanview to check on Dani, who had previously phoned him several times. He witnesses Dani collapse from a drug overdose due to her abuse of oxycodone. While she is recovering at the hospital, an alive Victor arrives. A surprised Téa, Dani, and Jack welcome Victor back, while Todd tries to bond with his children. Todd remains concerned about Jack and Dani, attempting to buy their affections with money and deciding the best way to win them over is to call a truce with Victor. He also tries to win back Blair's affections. He eventually admits he only pretended to get along with Victor to lure him into a false sense of security. Victor admits that he poisoned Todd's scotch with arsenic and then tried to strangle him. Jack takes Todd to the hospital, where he recovers but is frustrated when his family continues to defend Victor. Victor realizes he must leave town and says goodbye to his family. Todd shows Blair a threatening note he received with the names of all his loved ones on it. The mysterious Tattoo Organization that held Victor demands that Todd find and kill Victor. Todd, Blair and Téa devise a scheme to fool this organization into believing Victor is dead. Feeling secure that their scheme has worked, they plan for a future. Todd receives another note by the Tattoo Organization, this time telling him that he failed them and that Victor has been recaptured. Todd is told that he must leave Llanview and go to the address given on the note. Todd and Blair are devastated. Todd says goodbye to Viki and his children, but does not tell them the real reason he is leaving is to protect their family. Before Todd leaves, he and Blair make love one last time, and it is revealed that they have remarried.

Creation and development

Background
Todd was originally intended to be a short-lived role, but Howarth's portrayal of the character inspired notable fan reaction, which prompted the creators to layer Todd's personality and showcase him regularly within the series. Michael Malone, Todd's creator, said fleshing out the character reminded him of what he loved about soap operas, adding, "The story-telling is a genuine collaboration, not just among writers but by the actors." Malone felt he could not take full credit for the development of Todd from Marty Saybrooke's gang rapist to what he later became, and also noted Howarth's impact:

In the creation of Todd Manning, no one played a larger role than the remarkably talented Josh Griffith, first associate head writer, then co-head writer, during my stay at One Life. Josh loved, lived and breathed Todd and fought passionately for his position on the show. Second, Todd never would have evolved from "first frat boy" to the major cast member he became without the powerful talent of Roger Howarth. Because of Roger's ability to convey the complexity of Todd (the hurt as well as anger, the insecurity as well as bluster, the brains, yearning, manipulativeness, sexiness, tenderness, nastiness) we were able to explore both the deeply dark side of this character (the effort to destroy Marty to cover the rape, the attempted revenge on his lawyer Nora, the attack on Luna) and at the same time slowly uncover his growing struggle (usually a failed struggle) towards some kind of redemption. Romantic leads have often begun their careers playing villains (Valentino, Clark Gable, Humphrey Bogart among them). These characters appeal because they make women feel both the thrill of the "bad" and the lure of the hidden "good": they can lead the man to change through love. "I'll save him!" Fans loved Todd from the beginning because he always had that appeal.

Malone originally scripted Todd as a serial rapist. As part of the 1993 rape storyline, it was disclosed that Todd raped a woman named Carol Swift, a year or two before raping Marty, and that there were hints he raped other young women before Carol. Howarth considered Todd's rationale for raping Marty to be complex. "Todd was in love with Marty," he said. When Marty rejects Todd's romantic advances after their one-night stand, it is because he was cold to her that same night after they had sex. Marty's rejection upsets Todd and it festers. When he fails an exam after she tutors him, he blames her for the failure and begins attributing her as the reason for his problems. Howarth called Todd "privileged and very rich". Because Todd was used to getting what he wanted, he did not know how to cope with Marty rejecting him.

Although Todd is the product of an affair between Victor Lord and Irene Manning, Malone gave him the last name "Manning" without knowing the name of Victor's mistress, an oversight that allowed the writers to later reveal him as Tina and Victoria Lord's brother. He is at first presented as 18 years old, but over the years, his age has been changed based upon the occasional rapid aging of his children. Malone stated that making Todd heir to the Lord fortune gave the writers "huge story" that helped Howarth's character evolve from a short-term role to a major cast member, which Malone attributed to Howarth's "powerful talent". Peter Manning, who Todd thought was his father, had died; Todd receives letters written by his adoptive mother disclosing that he is the Lord heir, and worth almost $30 million. Developing Todd not only as Victoria's unwanted sibling, whom she was horrified to discover was her blood, but as "her professional rival" who used "a splashy tabloid newspaper to wipe out her venerable" newspaper The Banner appealed to Malone.

Executive producer Susan Bedsow Horgan, when speaking of Todd's psychological motivations, reported that Peter Manning degraded him verbally and abused his adoptive mother, whom Todd loved but who abandoned and disappointed him, leaving Todd with wounds that influenced his later behavior. Author Gerry Waggett stated that Peter Manning had physically abused Todd his entire life.

Signature scar, hair and facial cues

In late 1993, in order to make Todd look more menacing, he was given a scar to his right cheek by Marty's friend, Luna Moody, when she hit him in his face with a crowbar while preventing his attempt to rape Marty for a second time. The camera would often close in on and emphasize Todd's scar, which later became synonymous with the character.

To casting director Howard Meltzer, "Todd wears the scar like a badge. It's a warning to others: Don't mess with me." Meltzer felt Howarth underplayed Todd; Todd did not have to rant to incite fear. Meltzer added: "He gets a lot more from the raising of an eyebrow than raising the volume of his voice. Most of Todd's performance is reacting to the environment around him, and thanks to Howarth's expressiveness, viewers can see the wheels turning."  The scar also served to remind Todd of his past villainy against Marty. It was applied by glue, with a little makeup to make it look more authentic, and usually took ten minutes to apply.

Todd's long hair was also integral to the character. It was described by Soap Opera Magazine as "enigmatic, with an air of innate authority". The hair was said to demonstrate Todd's lack of pretense and to convey an "I don't care" attitude.  Todd's "overhanging brow" seemed threatening, but instead concealed the "intense, vulnerable eyes underneath", features that contrasted well with the character's "pouty, sensual mouth". The features, which conferred "a charming, boyish quality", could sometimes convey that Todd was less dangerous than he actually was. Photographer Robert Milazzo believed Howarth's hair softened Todd's character. "You don't expect that intensity because of it," he said, and felt that it made Todd more intriguing. Milazzo also stated that the combination of Todd's soft hair and intensity made Todd "a very complex character to look at".

An interviewer concluded that Howarth was physically attractive and that this may have contributed to the character's magnetism. Howarth replied, "I know what the convention of a good-looking person is, and I know that for some reason skinny white guys are big now. I guess you could blame it on that."

In November 2008, during St. John's portrayal of the character, Todd is given a new scar by John McBain during a physical altercation in which John beats Todd with a gun. The scar symbolized Todd's "second rape of Marty", and was considered "a poetic nod" to Todd's history. The scar was significantly smaller than the original but placed in the same spot; it was gone by January 2009. St. John stated, "I know. It's too bad. I honestly have no idea why they wouldn't keep that reminder on Todd's face. It might be an economical thing. You know it costs to apply that kind of makeup each day."

The most important aspect of Todd's appearance for St. John was his character's hair. His preference was that Todd's hair was a little shorter; he told Soap Opera Weekly (SOW) that he thought that Todd's hair was too "shaggy", which was not his personal style, and that he hoped the writers and producers would let him trim off a bit. When he first got the role, St. John's hair resembled Howarth's shorter chin-length haircut, which was initially worn from 2000 to 2003, and St. John was told by the writers and producers not to change his hair until further notice. St. John "made the creative choice [to let himself] go because [Todd's] not really right in the old noggin, and gained weight for the role.

"Todd's theme" and related music
 

One Life to Live's producers stated that most of the show's music was custom written, suitable for the situation and what the characters in the scene might actually play. For Todd, his volatile nature was represented with powerfully dark theme music, which producers and fans called the "Todd theme".  The music consisted of ominous low chords and signaled that Todd was about to commit a vicious, dangerous, or threatening act.

Composer David Nichtern, who created Todd's theme music, said he loved the character and enjoyed implementing the different versions of the Todd theme. While describing the music that marked Todd's prominent 1996 "return from the dead" storyline (which documented his return to town after being presumed dead), Nichtern addressed the broader aspect of his composition for the character: "All of Todd's music has had a certain 'vibe' to it, especially since the character is so well-drawn," he stated. "It also has seemed particularly well-suited to my guitar style, so I've enjoyed 'becoming' Todd musically. The key is always to represent his dark side, but with the possibility of redemption and power behind the whole thing." Nichtern added, "That's what makes him such an interesting character. Todd's cues are always custom-made so to speak, so there is energy and attention going toward getting the exact flavor of what the current story-line is saying about his journey."

Three primary musical themes were played throughout Todd's evolution. The original Todd theme, from 1993 to 1996, encompassed Todd's rape of Marty and his early misdeeds.  The second theme was heard throughout 1998 and 2000, and the third theme was first heard in 2001. The Todd and Marty rape scene was aided primarily by rock songs. Heard at a low volume in the background, hard rock songs assist moments building up to the rape; they intensify the otherwise implicitly tense, aggressive atmosphere, and set a chilling tone for viewers. When Todd is certain that he will rape Marty, right before going upstairs to Kevin's room where she rests, the volume of a song in the background ("Head Like a Hole") is increased, which emphasizes the lyrics: "I'd rather die/Than give you control." This use of background music allowed Todd's motivation for the rape to significantly register with viewers.

The menacing chords which played as Todd stalked and terrorized Nora in 1993 for mishandling his trial and sending him to prison were Todd's theme. There have been additional musical themes for Todd; for example, during his romance with Rebecca in 1994, an all-encompassing romantic theme with tragic nuances, which was at times intermixed with his ominous music, were heard. His rescue of Marty and two children from a car crash, and the Todd and Téa romance, also have their own musical themes. For the mid-1994 plot point where Todd rescues Marty and the children, the music was changed to reflect his decision to be a better person. It becomes his dominant theme, and is assisted by a tuneful, forward-moving melody. This music is primarily a part of Todd's 1994 redemption storyline and the storyline when he is the Lord heir in 1995. According to Nichtern, the music for Todd and Teá, which he composed with his friend keyboardist Kevin Bents, was "as close as we get to Todd 'romantic' music", with "the possibility of a little sensuality and romance".

For the "Todd returns from the dead" 1996 storyline, demented-sounding, on-edge music signifies that Todd's psyche has worsened. This theme accompanied Todd's emotional breakdown and revenge scheme after discovering his wife, Blair, having sex with Patrick.

Personality
At the time of Todd's introduction to OLTL, he was a competitive athlete. His fraternity was the most important part of his life; Howarth stated that Todd was "under intense pressure from the male figures in his life". He felt that the key to understanding Todd was his concern about his status and how others perceived him. He thought that Todd mistreated people because it made him feel better about himself and that he did not want to appear vulnerable, so his defense mechanisms "spun out of control". Howarth, during an April 1994 Soap Opera Update interview, said that the only thing that he admired about Todd was his clothing style. His interviewer called Todd's early fashion sense "grunge, Salvation Army like 'rags'," and Howarth described Todd's later wardrobe as "all Ralph Lauren" and "[d]ouble R.L. 80 dollar pants and a 400-and-something-dollar jacket". St. John, as Todd's second portrayer, described the character as "kind of both good and bad. He's got his good side with his kids, and yet he is conniving and vicious and all those negative things".

The show's writers presented Todd's personality as a combination of dark humor, uncouth behavior, and the essence of a tortured soul; he often delivers one-liners that range from humorous to sadistic. Soap opera columnist Jenn Bishop stated that Todd's personality is "violent, gentle, caring, apathetic, smart, obsessive, crazy, irrational, devilish, heroic, angst-filled, comical, etc." and that "[he] loves, but he feels he's unworthy of true love because of the things he's done. He doesn't love himself and projects a facade of a confident, arrogant playboy, but underneath it all, he's someone who seeks an unattainable love". Columnist Jill Berry, who saw Todd as self-centered in the extreme, said that although Todd desperately wants to be loved, he is unable to give or receive it, and when he is loved, he will destroy it. She did acknowledge Todd's capability of loving his children, which he expressed by doing "crazy and illegal things to prove it", but felt that much of the difficulty he experiences is brought on by himself and that he is incapable of learning from his mistakes even when they hurt the people he loves. She said Todd is in need of "intensive therapy", which will never work because he refuses to change.  For example, as portrayed by St. John in 2006, he fights for the custody of his son, Sam, but he is motivated by anger that he has been lied to and revenge more than by a desire to recover his child.

For several years on the series, a defining characteristic of Todd's personality was his resistance to close relationships and sexual intimacy, which were due to his mistreatment by others, especially his adoptive father, who may have raped him when he was fourteen. It was also due to his horrific past misdeeds, including his rape of Marty and dysfunctional aspects of his relationship with Blair. Surviving a near-death experience and being presumed dead in 1995 and, upon his return in 1996, finding Blair having sex with Patrick made Todd bitter; seeing Blair with another man sexually, soon after his presumed death, caused him to shut down emotionally. The writers made Todd's fear of intimacy into a prominent obstacle for his relationship with his second wife, Téa. When she at one point attempts to seduce Todd by stripping down naked in front of him and pleading with him to make love to her, he rejects her, explaining that he no longer trusts himself to be intimate in that way; he subsequently throws her out, practically naked, into the middle of a snowstorm.

Bishop stated, "Though viewers were given an explanation for his repulsive actions (lots and lots of childhood trauma), his crime was never excused or glossed over. Todd began to care for people – Rebecca, then Blair and later Téa – something missing in his earlier sociopathic characteristics." Soap opera commentator Kaydee Barnett stated that Todd's dark edges had been softened over a period of many years by Blair, Viki, and Starr. Todd's deep love for his sister, Viki, was partly demonstrated by him supporting her during her battle with cancer, her difficulties with her daughter and his niece, Jessica, and by defending Viki to her enemies. Berry enjoyed the vulnerability Viki brought out of Todd, and felt that his self-hatred demonstrated itself in many ways, including when he refused to name his son, Jack, after himself because his name carried too much baggage.

In the 1998 storyline where he fakes dissociative identity disorder (split personalities) to avoid a prison sentence for hostage and threat charges, he is given four personalities that represent his core being: A childlike personality named Tom, Italian playboy Rod, parental figure Miss Perkins, and the abusive Pete (the personality responsible for his worst misdeeds). The revelation that he is faking the personalities devastates Viki, who had actually suffered from the disorder; it also brings out remorse in Todd, and causes him to reflect on his mistakes. The storyline ends with the implication that the personalities may not have been as fabricated as Todd believed them to be. The writers also made it so that his difficulties are manifested in his nightmares, which give him insomnia and are designed as a look into his psyche; at multiple points within the series, Téa attempts to help Todd by encouraging him to open up to her about them, which he eventually does. His opinions on his enemies are conveyed clearly; he remains one step ahead of them, and consistently out-smarts police, family, and others he targets, sometimes using weapons.

Casting and portrayals

General
Following Howarth's 1992 casting as Todd Manning, he occasionally vacated the role. His 2003 departure was his longest absence from OLTL; he did not return to the series until 2011. Todd was recast in 2003 with St. John, and Howarth joined As the World Turns as Paul Ryan until it was cancelled in 2010. Malone stated that because of Todd's appeal, which he credited to Howarth, "The network was therefore happy to have him return to Llanview whenever Roger would come back, and happy to have him move into story in major ways." In April 2011, after several months of speculation, OLTL confirmed Howarth's return, although it was unclear if he would portray Todd Manning. He stated, "I am looking forward to returning to One Life to Live". Executive producer Frank Valentini said, "We are thrilled to have Roger return to One Life to Live". It was eventually revealed that St. John's version of the character was really Victor Lord, Jr., Todd's twin brother, conditioned to believe that he was Todd and assume Todd's identity, while the real Todd (Howarth) was held hostage for eight years.

OLTL was cancelled in early 2012; Howarth brought Todd to General Hospital (GH), along with his co-stars Kristen Alderson as Starr and Michael Easton as John McBain.  All three actors were forced to briefly leave GH when Prospect Park, the company that bought the rights to OLTL and aired an online version of the show in 2013, sued ABC for breach of contract. Prospect Park argued that ABC sabotaged its efforts by killing off two characters, Starr's boyfriend Cole and her young daughter Hope.  Both St. John and Howarth appeared on the online version as Victor and Todd, but the suit prevented ABC from continuing to feature Howarth, Alderson, and Easton as their original characters on GH; ABC's solution was to create new characters for the actors.  The online version of OLTL was cancelled after one season.

Howarth
Malone credited Howarth's versatility with the reason he was cast as Todd.  During a February 1993 interview with Soap Opera Digest (SOD), Howarth stated he was surprised he won the part. "I really don't know how I made it," he said. He met a One Life to Live casting director two years previously, while performing in a New York play, but, when the role of Todd opened up, he "auditioned just like everybody else". He "made it to callbacks, and [he] got the part". Howarth said, "I was hired ... to plant drugs in Jason Webb's jacket. All I knew was that my first name was Todd. I don't know what happened next. They called me in again and suddenly I had a last name 'Manning.' Then I get called to read another day."

Howarth stated, "I was happy to get the part of Todd, but it was the furthest thing from the fabric of my personality."  In an interview later that year, with Soap Opera Weekly, he grimaced when reminded of what he had said, and commented, "What a totally self-involved, pretentious thing to say."  He clarified his previous statement, saying that although he seemed to be consistently cast as a "bad guy" and as a "Greek frat brother-type", both his upbringing and experiences in college were different than those of Todd and his other roles.  For example, Howarth was not in a fraternity in college, and, unlike Todd and his previous soap opera roles, Kent in Loving and Jory on Guiding Light, status was unimportant to him.

Although Howarth was familiar with campus fraternity life while attending George Washington University, he did not base Todd or his other roles on anyone he knew.  When asked about his roles, he was unable to explain why he was consistently cast as a bad guy, but said that he enjoyed it. "I would never want to come in now and play a nice guy for three months. That would be dreadfully boring. This suits me fine. It's just as easy to pretend I'm a bad guy as it is to pretend I'm a good guy," Howarth said. Playing a rapist was like playing any other role because "[he knows] it's all make-believe". He was perplexed by writers' need to redeem villains. "Todd's a pretty interesting character just the way he is," Howarth said in late 1994. "There's no need to fix it if it's not broken. I don't know where the whole notion of redeeming characters comes from. People used to say to me, 'I hope you get redeemed so you can stay on the show.' Well, Todd hasn't been redeemed, and he's still on the show." He added, "I don't love the character I play. If I met Todd on the street, I wouldn't say 'Hi' to him, but I do love playing this character."

Howarth said of starring on a soap opera, "Every actor at one time passes through daytime. I wouldn't have said yes to the offer if I didn't want to stay a while on daytime." He added, "I don't crave fame. It's kind of goofy. I didn't want to be a public figure. I wanted to be an actor, not a movie star. But I love rock 'n' roll-there, I'd rather be a rock star. That would be cool." He said that "like all soap actors," he sticks with the script the majority of the time, "but every now and then he goes off the page," commenting, "You get to direct yourself. You come up with a little bit. It's improvisational. Maybe you're doing it just for your castmates, but the audience catches on."

In 1997 and 1998, Todd was given comedic partners similar to the set-up in comedy teams, in which the "funny guy" usually has a "straight man" who either sets up the joke or simply does not understand it.  Todd's first partner was Charlie Briggs, portrayed by actor Robert J. Hogan. Hogan was first seen as Briggs in 1995, working for the rival publication The Banner before Todd "[steals] him away" to work at his newspaper. Hogan said, "Briggs had been on the show for 17 years, but they never showed him." Scenes between Todd and Briggs typically involved Todd issuing "some bizarre order" to Briggs, or Todd asking Briggs a "way-out question" that was often "way out of line". During these scenes, Briggs would often respond with a stupefied look on his face. Though Briggs appeared lost at some of Todd's comments, Todd was sometimes unable to realize that the joke was about him. Hogan felt Briggs was "more than a match" for Todd. "You look at a kid yelling at you," he said, "and you can't take him seriously."

Another of Todd's comedic pairings is his friendship with a parrot he names Moose.  Todd is closer to Moose than he is to most humans.  He tells the bird his private thoughts and secrets, which causes conflict and antagonism between Moose and his wife at the time, Téa. Florencia Lozano, Téa's portrayer, stated, "My character ... has a very adversarial relationship with the bird ... It's sort of jealous of me, I'm jealous of the bird. We're both trying to get close to Todd."  The bird was portrayed by two South American blue and gold macaws named Flash and Lucky, and an Animal Planet documentary stated that they had developed an "impressive résumé" by the time they appeared on OLTL. They were trained by Ed Richman, who had worked with the birds for fifteen years in TV shows such as Magnum, P.I. and Jake and the Fatman. Richman stated that Howarth caught on "real quick" regarding his interaction with Flash and Lucky and said that he was the best actor he had worked with in the industry.  The parrots were used for different purposes: for intimidating scenes where it looked like Moose "was going to kill somebody", Richman used Flash, and Lucky was used for the "loving, very caring, physically close" portrayal of Moose.  Like other actors, the parrots were able to connect, in character, with their fellow castmembers and achieve comedic timing with them.  Voice actor Ron Gallop was hired to deliver Moose's lines, which were crafted to help demonstrate Todd's train of thought, signified Todd and Moose's close bond, and consisted of funny or insulting remarks aimed at anyone causing problems for Todd.

St. John
Howarth's departure from the series motivated OLTL writers and producers to do what many considered impossible: recast Todd.  During Michael Malone's second stint as head writer of OLTL, he had to decide if Todd would remain.  Malone said that he and the other creators could not allow Todd to permanently leave the show's canvas, so they chose to recast the role. They offered the role to Easton, who had portrayed the vampire Caleb Morley on the soap opera Port Charles, but he turned it down because he did not want to be affiliated with a role played by another established actor.  Malone said that St. John's audition was "extraordinary", and that although a committee was involved in the recast, everyone agreed "he was Todd".  Malone felt that they made a risky decision, but St. John made it work and that he had made the character his own.  Initially, St. John, in his first role in daytime television, was introduced as Walker Laurence, younger brother of Mitch Laurence.

Author Gerry Waggett stated that Walker was "reinvented as Todd with plastic surgery" after the show's viewers accepted St. John as a part of the cast. The soap opera press and fans speculated for several months that Todd had been recast with St. John. Website Soap Central.com stated that despite executive producer Frank Valentini neither confirming nor denying it, St. John's character exhibited "Todd-like" behavior.  TV Guide confirmed the speculation and reported that St. John, when asked about it, stated, "That would be fascinating, though I don't see how it would work," and added, "Todd [had] a different voice and height, but this is a soap world and anything can happen."

St. John's version of Todd had undergone plastic surgery after being severely beaten during a murder attempt on his life ordered by Mitch Laurence. While recovering in the hospital, Todd conducts research and learns Mitch has a brother named Walker (also portrayed by St. John), who goes by the name Flynn Laurence. Todd pays Flynn for information on Mitch, and has extensive plastic surgery in order to physically resemble Flynn and get revenge on (as well as protect his family from) Mitch.  The writers revealed Walker's true identify slowly, allowing Walker to develop as a new character before hinting that he could be Todd.

St. John was unaware that Malone and the producers of OLTL were considering him as Todd, but had no strategy in his performance once he won the role.  When speaking of the recast, he stated, "It's nice, because I had instant concrete relationships."  He liked that he could consult old scripts and his fellow castmembers to gain information about his character, resources he did not have when playing Walker.  He was able to use these resources to figure out his relationship to other characters, which helped him analyze how to play a scene.  St. John stated that as an actor, he let the audience interpret the character, and believed in exploring and portraying the moment as it was written in the script. He said, "Todd is already written on the page, so it's my job to bring him to life in that moment."

St. John was instructed by the show's directors to watch about fifteen episodes of Howarth's performances of Todd because they wanted him to portray Todd like Howarth did. St. John reported that he watched two episodes, but never tried to mimic Howarth's style because he felt that it was limiting, uncreative, and destructive. He said, "I needed to get a sense of who Todd was first, and that has to happen organically." He did not care if Marlon Brando portrayed the role before him, and said that even actors who portray Hamlet do it differently, adding, "I don't care what the other guy did. That's his time." St. John felt that it was up to him to decide how to perform Todd. "I know that sounds very arrogant and overconfident," he stated, "but it would be no fun to try to mimic somebody."

Unlike how most actors are trained, St. John believed that it was not up to the performer to interpret the character, but that a character existed regardless of how an actor played him, which he realized was "an unusual way to approach acting".  He also thought that playing Todd was fun and "never boring to watch" because Todd, although popular with the audience, is an unlikable character. St. John told Branco that when people asked him if Todd was capable of harming his loved ones, like his long-time love Blair or daughter Starr, St. John would say that Todd was capable of anything, even being sexually attracted to Starr or one of her friends, because to state otherwise meant that he was "limiting the character". He added, "Todd is a marvelous character to play because he could commit genocide, or find a cure for AIDS. He's full of possibilities—good and bad ... See, as an actor that always gives you conflict to play—and that subtext enriches a performance."

Early writing and literary analysis

Archetypes and rape
Howarth said writers go with a recognizable archetype when creating soap opera characters.  Writer Jennifer Hayward felt the same, stating that like 19th century melodrama and serials, soap operas draw on powerful archetypes. Writer Dianne L. Brooks states that the storyline conforms to many of the same conventions of how rape has been presented in soap operas.  According to Hayward, the OLTL writers "had a terrific time camping up Todd as the embodiment of evil". She said that the writers who created Todd's first major storyline, the gang rape of Marty Saybrooke and its aftermath, treated rape like most soap operas had done in the past, by using archetypes such as the fight between good and evil and the contrast between the weak and strong. Author Gerry Waggett said, "The close-ups of the rapists' faces during the assault, distorted to capture Marty's scared and drunken perspective, rank among the show's most graphic images."  An attempt was made to dramatize the rape and present it differently than the typical voyeuristic perspective, and the scenes were designed to disturb the audience.  Waggett added: "Marty's subsequent quest to bring her rapists to justice dominated the show" throughout the summer of 1993.

Up to this point, soap operas used rape and its related archetypes to, like their nineteenth-century melodrama counterparts, "critique power relationships, especially the oppression of the poor by the rich and of women by men".  Hayward believes that the storyline was initially flawed because two of the rapists, Todd and Zach, were demonized, which oversimplified rape and "failed to capture the complex power relations underlying ... violence towards women".  The perpetrators were "simply evil or out control", so they and their mindsets they represented could be rejected.  The three characters represented three archetypes of the rapist: "the evil instigator" (Todd); "the good resister" (Powell), and "the mediator between these polarized figures" (Zach), but also represented a departure from how rape was treated in soap operas.  Brooks called the rapists "a complicated alternative to the standard soap opera rapist", because they had a different relationship with their victim than in previous rape narratives and because they were multiple. Todd, whom Brooks called the "evil 'other, was the leader and most villainous of the group and had a previous physical relationship with Marty.  Hayward said, "What becomes especially clear is that for these characters the act of rape is not about sex, about women, or even about Marty. It is about what takes place ... between men."

Like serials throughout history, soap operas use the unstable identity as a literary device, which is evidenced by the genre's use of mistaken identities, evil twins, and characters that suffer from multiple personality disorder and whom come back from the dead.  Identity is used in the rape storyline as well.  Before the rape, Todd was crude yet still human, but afterwards, he became a dehumanized embodiment of rage, demonstrated by Todd's bizarre and dangerous behavior after his conviction. Powell Lord, whose name is full of the same kind of symbolism Dickens used when choosing his characters' names and who initially urges his friends to let Marty go yet ultimately gives into peer pressure, is a "relative 'good character as compared to Todd's absolute evil' identity". In Hayward's opinion, "The show also departs from the rape paradigm not only by insisting on the essential 'goodness' of Powell Lord ... but even more startlingly by redeeming the evil Todd".  Initially, "the increasingly guilt-ridden" Powell is the only rapist who has a conscience.  He attempts to convince Todd and Zach to confess their crime, and comes close to confessing to his lawyer.  Hayward calls Powell, like Todd, "redeemed", but unlike Todd, was so guilt-ridden that he attempted suicide, was forgiven by Marty, and received a much lighter jail sentence than Zach or Todd.

Redeeming Todd
Initially, Todd, as described by Hayward, was written as "unequivocally bad: sullen, remorseless, charmless".  As Todd's popularity grew with the audience, mostly due to Howarth's abilities to portray Todd as more than a one-dimensional rapist, Malone and executive producer Susan Bedsow Horgan chose the controversial option of redeeming Todd rather than killing him off or permanently sending him to prison, which is what soap operas had usually done with irredeemable rapists in the past. The writers began to redeem Todd, or change him so that he could be incorporated into the show, in the spring of 1994, a year after the rape. Hayward states that it required "a whole arsenal of symbolic weaponry," something that had never happened in soap operas before. Malone was intrigued by crafting the story in this way, and saw it as the spiritual journey of a man who wanted forgiveness for his past misdeeds.

Malone stated that Todd believes that he does not deserve forgiveness, which contributes to him embracing his worst qualities, something Malone felt worked better due to Howarth's acting choices, which prevented Todd from acquiring redemption easily. Malone felt the most important part of Todd's redemption was to have him re-confront Marty in order to better deal with the fact he initiated her rape. As well as having Todd risk his freedom from prison and save Marty from a car crash, Todd donates his own blood to Marty to ensure she survives. A year later, he risks his life to save Patrick, Marty's lover, from death; this act leads to Todd's presumed death. Despite having the character yearn to be thought of as a decent human being, the writers felt his good deeds should never make him feel any less horrible for having raped Marty.  Initially, Howarth disagreed, and did not consider the storylines to be redemptive. "[Todd's] not being redeemed at all," he said.  "Todd, as I see it, is looking for a way to overcome this rage so he can live in society again. From now on, his menace will be on the surface, not exploding. It's more interesting if his violence is on the surface and that he play against it. That's where the subtlety is."

Hayward stated that the writers turned Todd from a realistic soap opera character into "the villain appropriated from nineteenth-century melodrama" and Gothic fiction traditions.  After Todd is sent to prison for Marty's rape, he vows he will escape, and does so by drugging himself and forcing himself to wake up from a coma, which allows him to escape from a speeding ambulance. He returns to Llanview to stalk and terrorize Nora, the lawyer who threw his court case, who had gone temporarily blind. He tries to rape Marty for the third time, later inadvertently kills Marty's boyfriend Suede during a scuffle, kidnaps the evangelist Rebecca Lewis, and is shot by the police, but survives.  The writers also began to deepen his character by emphasizing his tenderness towards Rebecca and showing flashbacks of the abuse he experienced from his adoptive father, which Hayward states does not "historicize the problem but simply removes the cause of violence one step".  Laurie Stone of the Village Voice commented that Howarth's performance steered Todd away from cartoon villainy, "heightening the character's wildness as a dodge from sentimentality and high-mindedness". Instead of killing Todd off as other soap operas had done to other unrepentant rapists, OLTL chose, as Stone put it, "to renovate the genre: maintaining Todd as a rapist, while enlarging his human dimension".

Stone addressed how the writers kept Todd on the OLTL canvas, stating, "Characters as dangerous as Todd go up in flames on soaps. You can see little coffins on their eyelids, leaving only one question: how will the fiend get whacked?" Stone said that "Todd was this close to being offed, but Howarth made that choice laughable. Rampaging through fictional Llanview, he injected ambiguity into the bluntest dialogue, his sneers averting cynicism to reveal depression and humor" and "transformed Todd into a soul-wrenched Lucifer, his rage ripped from abuse and bathed in vengeful glee, his sexiness rising off his instinct for survival and his outlaw impulse to disrupt." She added, "Even the ragged scar he acquired on one cheek only heightened his animal appeal. No soap would jettison such gold and electricity—a figure simultaneously furious, ironic, melancholy, and horny."

The writers used strong imagery to redeem Todd.  Malone, who had been a novelist and was known for his "Dickensian" plots on OLTL, was influenced by nineteenth-century literature.  Malone told Stone that he compared Rebecca's decision to marry Powell instead of Todd to Cathy's decision to marry Edgar Linton instead of Heathcliff in Wuthering Heights.  According to Stone, Todd is a classical character−"a soap character of unprecedented psychological complexity, a being whose feelings are intrinsically mixed and mostly unresolvable".

Hayward stated that Malone and his team of writers used four techniques drawn from the conventions of Victorian sentimental fiction to redeem Todd: his unhappy childhood with an aloof but caring mother and abusive father; sending Todd to church to confess his past sins and present impulses; his love for Rebecca, "an innocent and highly religious virgin"; and his friendship with two children, C.J. and Sarah Roberts.  Hayward calls Rebecca, with her "open-mouthed passivity" and "pre-Raphaelite curls", "almost a caricature of Dicken's more sentimental and less felicitous heroines".  She believes that many of Todd's scenes with Rebecca are heavily iconic, with symbolic representations of the Virgin Mary and Freudian images of Todd's own feminization.
 
Hayward compares Todd to Mary Shelley's monster (Frankenstein's monster), especially his friendship with C.J. and Sarah. Shelley's monster watches two children playing, and saves a young girl from drowning. Similarly, Todd rescues C.J. and Sarah's cousin, Jessica, from being manhandled by an older boy; this leads to him meeting C.J. and Sarah. Like Shelley's monster, Todd observes the family's happy moments from afar, and wishes to be part of their lives. He uses his time alone to make toys for the children. Once they accidentally discover him, he manipulates them into keeping his whereabouts a secret by telling them he is "a genie on the run from an evil master". Hayward said, "The stories he tells them function as clear metaphors for his feelings about his father." Stone added that Todd's counseling sessions in prison were the writers' attempts to redeem Todd, and both she and Hayward include one of the final techniques the writers used: Todd's rescue of Marty, Jessica and C.J. soon after a car crash.  Hayward calls the writers' attempts to use powerful narrative and visual techniques to redeem Todd "dubious at best".

Writer Mary D. Dutta believed that OLTL, in order to "assuage the moral qualms associated with a sympathetic rapist", added "mitigating reasons for Todd's sexual abuse of Marty"; namely, that he was raped at the age of fourteen by his adoptive father, Peter Manning, though whether or not he was raped is disputed. Dutta feels that the gang rape storyline invokes many of the rape myths that have appeared in literature since the 18th century, which includes "only bad girls get raped," "women ask for it," and "women 'cry rape' only when they've been jilted or have something to cover up". Dutta also includes the myth of the "reformed rake", or "the rapist redeemed by the woman who loves him, not uncommonly the same woman he raped", which "deny or reduce perceived injury, or ... blame the victims for their own victimization". Dutta states, "Todd's redemption begins with his rescue of Marty and two children from a car wreck and ends with the discovery that he is the rightful heir to a huge fortune."

Reception and impact

General popularity
Todd's impact is varied. The rape storyline inspired feminist studies, and, in 1994, OLTL was awarded several Daytime Emmys in writing and acting for all the principles involved. Michael Malone and Josh Griffith's team won an Emmy for writing, Susan Haskell won an Emmy for Outstanding Supporting Actress in a Drama Series, and Hillary B. Smith was awarded the Daytime Emmy Award for Outstanding Lead Actress in a Drama Series. Howarth won the Daytime Emmy Award for Outstanding Younger Actor in a Drama Series.  In 1995, Howarth was nominated for an Outstanding Supporting Actor in a Drama Series and Soap Opera Digest (SOD) named him Outstanding Leading Actor.  SOD also named him Outstanding Villain in 1998. While Howarth has been called a "fan favorite, and one of the best actors in soaps", Todd has been called "one of the greatest characters of all-time" and Howarth's portrayal of him has been called "iconic". The Hollywood Reporter stated that even though Todd was a convicted rapist, he was the most popular character and Howarth was the most popular actor on OLTL. According to Waggett, the rape storyline propelled Todd "onto the list of OLTL most despicable villains".  He said that due to the storyline and to Howarth's talent, Todd "became the show's next centerpiece villain and eventually the show's male lead".  Howarth appeared on several interview shows following his Emmy win in 1994, including the Phil Donahue Show in May, with six other male soap stars, and later that month, on Live! with Regis and Kathie Lee. Host Regis Philbin commented on the fact that Howarth was receiving more fan mail than any other American soap opera star, and called him "a terrible villain, who's become a heartthrob to thousands of wildly adoring fans". TV Guide referred to Todd as a breakout character.

At the height of Todd's popularity, which was called "Todd-mania" and "the Todd Manning phenomenon", Howarth was disturbed that so many women were attracted to Todd and that the show's writers had begun to redeem the character.  In a September 1995 interview with The Hollywood Reporter, the publication stated that Howarth was troubled that "his villainous character became such a fan favorite". In October 1995, Howarth told SOD, "People have come up to me and said, 'My 7-year-old loves you.' What do I say to that? I'm not going to tell them, 'Don't let your 7-year-old watch TV.' But I have to say, it's disturbing."  He gave credit to the show's writers for Todd's popularity, saying that the rapists' trial was well constructed and added, "I think, right now, we're just riding the wave of something that started last summer. Beyond that, I don't really know why people like Todd".

Todd's rampant popularity intruded on Howarth's life. "It's really starting to frustrate me because I can't just go to work anymore," he said. He stopped doing a lot of press interviews after female fans screamed "Rape me, Todd" at fan events, and because of his disagreement with Todd's redemption arc. His comings-and-goings from time to time throughout the years, even though the role of Todd had been re-cast with St. John, were greeted with anticipation, excitement, and speculation from the fans. At one point in 2000, Howarth returned for a week, accompanied by significant fanfare, in order to assist with the departure of Florencia Lozano (Teá). During the ten years he was on the show, rumors of his departures were reported sometimes weekly by the soap opera press.

Soap Opera Magazine attributed the success of Todd to Howarth's face and skill as an actor. In February 1998, the magazine stated, "Although the scar that traverses his face while he plays Llanview's dark prince isn't real, the menacing intensity Roger Howarth can so effortlessly convey with his eyes and furrowed brow are frighteningly authentic." Soap Opera Weekly called his presence "hypnotic" and stated that his eyes relayed his focus.  The magazine added that Howarth "has given Todd such a deliciously frightening edge we hope he wreaks more havoc in Llanview".  Marla Hart of the Chicago Tribune stated that "it has been an unexpected pleasure to watch actor Roger Howarth as a lost soul in search of spiritual redemption". Hart speculated that the darkness Howarth brought to the role made him interesting to watch and was responsible for his Emmy win in 1994.

St. John and the writers received praise for the recast, and for successfully re-integrating Todd into the show's canvas. Soap Opera Weekly stated, "They said it couldn't be done. One Life to Live's Todd (previously played by Roger Howarth) could not be recast. But with an appealing actor and the right pacing, One Life to Live may just have done it". The magazine stated that the writers revealed Todd's identity slowly, letting Walker develop as a character before dropping hints that he might be Todd.  By the time he disclosed who he really was to his daughter Starr, the audience had already suspected the truth. Soap Opera Weekly called the reveal scene between St. John and Alderson, who played Starr, "one of those great (and, these days, rare) must-see moments".  Soap Opera Digest said that despite the recast, a difficult situation in and of itself, "St. John aptly distinguished between Walker, who's really Todd, as well as Flynn, who pretended to be Walker". The magazine stated that St. John revealed glimmers of Todd to the audience: "We could see Todd when Walker lowered his eyes while holding back from telling his sister, Viki; with fiancee Blair, Walker's gaze was always shifting, making sure nothing could clue her in to his secret". The article also credited St. John with maintaining "the [uniquely scheming] relationship of Todd and Starr" and for keeping their scenes touching and delightful.

On May 29, 2006, in what the soap opera section of SheKnows described as "one of the most memorable moments" for OLTL, and "breathtaking, nerve-racking, heart wrenching", St. John portrayed Todd being executed for a crime he did not commit. At the last moment, after the lethal injection has been administered, John McBain rushes in declaring Todd's innocence, with proof: the woman Todd is accused of killing (Margaret Cochran) is at his side, clearly still alive. Todd is revived soon afterward.  During the execution episode, a montage a little over four minutes in length was shown while a song played in the background.  The song was called "Forsaken" (or "Todd's Song") and written by Michal Towber especially for the show.  The montage included reaction shots of those witnessing the execution, shots of Starr crying in the presence of a lynch mob outside the prison, and flashbacks of Todd's children and of Blair during both St. John and Howarth's tenures as Todd, with Howarth's face unseen. The scenes were called "unbearable" by viewers, and their responses were varied. Much of the audience was infuriated by Blair's unwillingness to believe that Todd was innocent. Many viewers thought that Todd's death was permanent; Soap Opera Digest speculated that this was due to limited Internet access or to a lack of interest in spoilers.

Although fans and St. John's co-workers felt that he deserved an Emmy nomination for his death row performances, he did not receive one, but OLTL received a nomination for Outstanding Drama Series by submitting the episode.  One soap opera website criticized St. John's Emmy snub, stating that it was incongruous that the show's Best Show nomination was due in large part to St. John's performance.  Soap opera commentators Nelson Branco and Michael Fairman called St. John's execution performances the best on any daytime drama in the early 2000s.  Towber and other composers for the show were nominated for Outstanding Achievement in Music Direction and Composition for a Drama Series.

Controversy and fan debate

Rape and redemption
Although the gang rape storyline was well-received, it was also criticized. Jennifer Hayward, in her literary analysis of the rape and its similarity to nineteenth century melodrama, stated that this storyline not only polarized "the gap between rapists and the raped but also the figure of the rapist himself", and that insisting on "the 'essential' goodness" of Powell Lord implied that peer pressure "could be an adequate (or even physiologically possible) excuse for rape". Scholar Mary Buhl Dutta, arguing that the storyline perpetuated rape myths, commented on how the series especially used Marty, who fulfilled the stereotype of "the bad girl" who was the rape victim. Dutta stated that "Marty had once 'cried rape when the Rev. Andrew Carpenter "rebuffed her romantic overtures, falsely accusing him of sexually abusing a boy he was counseling".  After she was actually raped, she falsely yet unintentionally accuses Kevin Buchanan, who was innocent.  Marty, according to Dutta, "is a 'bad girl' because she had a one-night stand with Todd before the rape, bolstering his later claim she 'asked for it' in their second sexual encounter".

Critics have wondered why Todd is popular. Soap opera journalist Marlena De Lacroix, who acknowledged that she neither liked nor understood Todd, expressed her inability to understand his popularity among so many fans, even during his several hiatuses from the show. She asked, "Why has the show devoted years of storyline time to him and all but made a hero out of a criminal?"  Hayward, who said that her own response to Todd's redemption was ambivalent, called the writers' attempt to redeem Todd controversial and stated that the role of Rebecca, the woman the writers paired Todd with during the redemption process, "seems to encourage both female and male fantasies about the power of a 'good woman' to save a man from his own violent impulses".  In his book Behold the Man, Edisol Dotson suggested that viewers accepted Todd's redemption because he was physically attractive. Dotson stated, "Were Todd an ugly man, he would have never been forgiven, and female fans would not crowd the studio's backdoor shouting his name."

Soap opera commentator Jenn Bishop said she found it difficult to explain Todd's popularity, and that if she is perplexed about her feelings regarding him, it is understandable that others would be as well. "If I were to give a surface level assessment of Todd, I'd say he's an abhorrent character with little to no redeeming qualities," she said. "His actions, which span from the immoral to criminal, can be downright heinous. I wouldn't want to know Todd, let alone be around him in real life. Nor would I want any woman to have any sort of relationship with him." Instead of seeing Todd as an antihero, she saw him as more of "an anti-anti-hero" and stated that what added to his appeal was that his rape storyline was authentic. "While Todd is not the first (or the last) soap character to have committed this crime, the realness of this particular storyline didn't leave a lot of room for rewrites," Bishop commented. "For example, Luke's rape of Laura on General Hospital was rewritten and for years was referred to as a 'seduction.' There was no 'grey area'. This [Todd's rape of Marty] could not be dismissed as simply the behavior of a romantic rogue." To Bishop, the end result of this aspect, and that the writers had Todd generally pay for his crimes, "was the development of a dynamic, unpredictable, multi-faceted character with many traits that conflict with one another" and "[a]ll this makes for one messed up guy, intriguing to the viewers and one I can't help but like".

Hayward categorized the writing team involved in Todd's redemption as "an usually high number of male writers", and as an unusual situation because, historically, most soap opera writers have been women. In a June 1994 interview with TV Guide, in an article about the trend during the early 1990s of redeemed rapists on soap operas, head writer Malone commented that "[t]he bond between the woman and the violator is a great historical tradition in fiction and films," and said that Rudolph Valentino, Humphrey Bogart, Kirk Douglas, and Clark Gable "all began as totally irredeemable villains."  Although he did not think that most women want to be raped or are drawn to violence, he said that viewers "are responding to the intensity of passion and an actor who lets you inside the torment. Some [women] believe they can be swept up in that passion and still turn it good. They think, 'With me, he'd be different.  The author of the article, Michael Logan, supported Malone's statements, and commented, "Let's call a spade a spade. There is a large contingent of American female soap viewers who find something very attractive about rapists".  Hayward reported that many female viewers were furious that Logan had described them this way, and stated that their attraction to Todd was due to the skill of the actor portraying him.

Howarth said he had no desire to portray a redeemed Todd, and that the show would be better off finding "a Todd who won't object to the material." He subsequently left the series for a year. In the October 24, 1995 Soap Opera Digest issue, he stated:In the beginning, the character of Todd was successful. I'll always be proud of this story, because it was the result of a real team effort. It was one of those spectacular times when the writer, producer, director, grips, engineers and actors were all on the same wavelength. Everybody was working toward a common goal. My task, at the time, was to show the humanity of someone who was basically inhuman. Todd wasn't one-dimensional, but he was definitely a serious psychopath. Todd was a serial rapist. He raped Carol Swift. Then, he raped Marty Saybrooke, and that rape was brutal, intense, violent and realistic. There were innuendos he had raped other women before. He stalked Nora, he stalked and tried to rape Luna. [Then-Executive Producer] Linda Gottlieb told me with reasonable certainty that [One Life to Live] would not try to redeem Todd. So, I didn't think the character would change. Then about a year ago, it became clear to me they were taking the character on a different path—they were redeeming him. In my mind, I'd been hired to play Todd Manning, a very realistic, serious psychopath. But now, the powers-that-be wanted me to play Todd Lord. And the story of Todd Lord is not realistic—it's a fairy tale. I thought, "It would be best for the show if I were to leave." That's when I tendered my resignation.

Howarth also stated that Todd and Marty suddenly bonding, even if reluctantly, did not make sense and that he could not, in good conscience, support Todd's redemption by continuing to play him as Todd Lord, who had become a likable character.  Since the rape was, as he called it, "so in-depth and so brutal", he viewed Todd and Marty doing something like having drinks with each other bizarre. Entertainment Weekly reported that One Life to Live agreed to let Howarth go on the condition he would not appear on another soap opera for twelve months. Indy Week said, "Todd was partially redeemed into a self-destructive antihero who remained popular until the show's end, but his portrayer and many critics were wary of having him becoming a romantic lead."

Merchandising
In 2002, as part of ABC's push to sell merchandise from its soap operas, the network began selling a doll in Todd's likeness on its website, but were thwarted by a backlash. Modeled after cartoon versions of the Manning family that Starr would sometimes imagine, the doll sold for $19.95. According to the description on the site, it was "an all-cloth doll with brown felt hair and blue eyes. He is 20 inches standing. He wears a blue shirt and black pants". The doll's face also included Todd's scar. Even though several years had passed since the gang rape and Todd had "since settled down", and had become a more sympathetic character, rape victim advocate groups thought that selling the doll glorified sexual assault; so ABC removed the doll from its online store. Pictures of the doll were pulled from the Internet and the doll was blocked from being available at eBay or any other online store.

The controversy began when the industry newsletter "The Jack Myers Report" harshly criticized ABC for selling the doll, and other news outlets reported the snafu.  Bob Tedeschi of The New York Times stated, "In the charge toward e-commerce revenues, ABC learned a useful lesson last week: Don't try to sell cuddly rag dolls depicting homicidal rapists". Angela Shapiro, president of ABC, said, "I was insensitive and take total responsibility for it. I should have been sensitive to the history of the character and I wasn't". Another ABC executive stated, "We didn't exercise proper sensitivity to the history of the character of Todd.  We have re-evaluated and decided not to sell the doll".  A doll of Todd's daughter, Starr, remained in ABC stores. Richard Roeper of the Chicago Sun-Times commented, "I suppose ABC didn't have much of a choice but to pull the product--but I have to wonder about the people who voiced those protests." He added, "It was a stupid SOCK DOLL based on a SOAP OPERA CHARACTER. If you're offended by that, how do you get through the day without succumbing to fits of hysterical outrage every five minutes?"

Recasting
When Todd was recast with St. John after Howarth's departure, many fans felt that like the roles of Luke Spencer (Anthony Geary) on General Hospital and Erica Kane (Susan Lucci) on All My Children, Todd should be portrayed only by the actor who had originated the role.  As Soap Opera Digest put it, "Few recasts caused more uproar". Soap Opera Digest also stated that while there were fans who "will only consider Howarth to be their beloved Todd", St. John won over many fans by putting a lighter spin on the character. Soap Opera Weekly stated that they were "on board with St. John".  Soap Opera Digest agreed, commenting that St. John made the transition believable while adding new facets to the character. The magazine also stated that Todd's new appearance aided in his continuing redemption.  Soap opera columnist Jill Berry expressed her approval for the recast, stating, "Trevor's Todd continues to impress me. He has given some sweetness to Todd that I find totally appealing".

In late 2006, St. John and Howarth simultaneously began contract negotiations with their respective shows, which caused rumors that St. John was departing from OLTL, leaving room for Howarth, who was with the soap opera As the World Turns at the time, to return as Todd. TV Guide sought to clear up the matter and questioned executive producer Frank Valentini, who stated that although he was not able to comment on contracts, the producers were "doing our best to make sure that we do right by the audience".  In 2007, TV Guide received official confirmation Howarth would not be returning to the series.  The magazine conducted a poll on its website, TV Guide.com, and found that 82 percent of the show's viewers wanted to see Howarth return.  Daniel R. Coleridge of TV Guide.com disagreed with the results, stating, "Perhaps I'm in the minority, but I absolutely adore Trevor St. John", whose portrayal of Todd he found "very cocky, arrogant and humorous in a sexy way".

In 2009, following the announcement that As the World Turns would be cancelled in 2010, rumors that Howarth would return to OLTL regained momentum. The rumors were further fueled by an August 2010 episode of OLTL, in which Howarth's picture was shown and a delirious Téa stated that the current Todd (St. John) was not Todd Manning. This resulted in what Dan Kroll of the website Soap Opera Central.com described as fans "rac[ing] to their computers to figure out the meaning of the scene". Kroll speculated that the scene was "crafted merely to get fans talking, or was it a hint to viewers something big was coming down the pike?"  Soap Opera Network, citing unnamed sources and pointing to the 2010 episode, reported on their website that they had "learned exclusively Howarth [would] indeed be returning" to the series in the near future. Soap Opera Digest columnist Carolyn Hinsey dismissed the report, stating on her Facebook page, "Seriously, stop with the Howarth misinformation here please.  He is not coming back to OLTL. Case closed."  Some fans were convinced that St. John's character was an impostor, while others were not; although Howarth eventually returned as Todd in 2011, his return was initially accompanied with fan debate regarding what role he would play, Todd Manning or a new character.

Violence towards teenagers
According to Nelson Branco of TV Guide, OLTL aired "some of the most explosive and ugliest scenes ever broadcast on daytime" television in March 2008 when Todd beat up teenager Cole Thornhart (his daughter's boyfriend and Marty's son), and slapped Starr and Cole's friends Markko Rivera and Langston Wilde.  Todd barges in on Starr and Cole in bed together for the first time, jumping to the conclusion that Cole had raped her, "and [beats] the son of his rape victim relentlessly".  At least one soap opera blogger was outraged, and wanted Todd to be punished.

In Branco's opinion, head writer Ron Carlivati wanted to use the storyline to return Todd to his dark roots by showing him as a monster again, stating, "Carlivati chose to do something unique, bold and risky with one of his marquee characters", demonstrating Todd's damaged personality and calling into question his mental stability. Carlivati said that Todd was convinced that Starr's alleged rape was karmic payback, even when Starr insisted that she had not been raped.  Branco postulated that Todd's conclusion and strong reaction to seeing the two in bed together was Todd's inability to separate sex from violence, stating, "Todd, in that instance, became unhinged, paranoid, and out-of-control". Todd was in denial, and even almost hit Starr twice when she challenged his beliefs.  The scenes were praised as "riveting".  Soap columnist Marlena De Lacroix, a self-described "Todd hater" who felt that the character was psychotic, expressed hope that they were "the beginning of a storyline that will delve into Todd's mind and enlighten viewers as to the complexities of a character who is mentally ill". De Lacroix worried that although the storyline had the potential to be memorable, it could be another way to build sympathy for Todd.

Revictimizing Marty

Deciding to revisit the rape storyline in 2007, Carlivati wrote a story in which Marty is thrown from a van during a car crash later that year. The van explodes, and she is presumed dead.  In June 2008, Todd discovers her alive, and finds that she is afflicted with amnesia and has been crippled since the crash. He starts to nurse her back to health, lying to her about her identity and her importance to the people she loves, and he starts to develop romantic feelings for her.  ABC promoted the storyline by airing ads that called it, "The story you thought you'd never see". Carlivati defended the storyline by assuring the audience, who was concerned about and resisted the storyline, that it would not have been written if Marty had not lost her memories. He stated that he was aware of how serious it was pairing the characters romantically, but did not feel like they were damaging Marty's character.  Carlivati was committed to having the storyline progress slowly, and to using the actors' and characters' chemistry. Eventually, Todd and Marty have sex; Todd insists that he has always been in love with Marty and plots to steal his daughter's baby (who is also Marty's grandchild), run off with Marty and the baby, and raise the baby with her.  

According to Branco, the show's past writing teams had proposed creating a Marty and Todd love story, but it never happened, mostly because Haskell and Howarth had refused to participate. In Branco's opinion, the push toward the storyline was the reason Howarth eventually left OLTL for As the World Turns. By contrast, at a fan gathering in 2008, St. John joked about Todd and Marty bonding during the Carlivati storyline, stating, "I'm all for gang rape." He later issued an apology for the comment: "I should know better than to ever try and make a joke about such a serious subject. I intended no disre[s]pect and apologize to anyone I offended."

De Lacroix found Carlivati's storyline "disgusting", stating that it was exploitative, misogynistic, insulting to the audience, and "the most phony, stupidly contrived story I have ever seen". She also felt that it was a severe misjustice to the original storyline. Fans who were opposed to the storyline called it "the re-rape", and ABC aired public service announcements (PSAs) during the Todd and Marty sex scene for their viewers. Berry supported ABC's use of the PSAs, but felt that they were used to justify the storyline and stated that it would have been better to not have presented it in the first place.  Lynn Parrish, a spokesperson for Rape, Abuse & Incest National Network (RAINN), which was not consulted by the show's writers, spoke out against the "re-rape" storyline.  She told Branco, "There is nothing romantic about rape", and that "whoever writes a romance between a rapist and its victim under any circumstances clearly doesn't understand rape nor violence—and probably shouldn't be writing about it".

Branco called the original rape storyline "the gold standard of rape stories," and stated that Carlivati had changed it into a soap opera cliché. Carlivati's addition to the characters' histories left him feeling betrayed, hurt, depressed, angry, insulted, and disgusted, and he said that he had wasted almost 20 years investing in and believing in the original rape storyline. At the "re-rape" storyline's conclusion, Branco stated that the payoff was worth the tense moments. "However obscene or depraved the riskiest storyline in recent memory was," he said, "the fallout has been shockingly riveting—thanks to the fact that head writer Ron Carlivati is playing all the psychological beats of Todd's self-serving and criminal actions." Branco also gave credit to St. John. "Nominated for a 2009 Soap Opera Spirit Award as outstanding lead actor, St. John inarguably faced the most challenging assignment of any actor in 2008—in any genre," said Branco. "And yet, somehow, St. John made it work. In a lesser actor's hands, the storyline most certainly would have resulted in career suicide for all involved."

Notes

References

Works cited 
Brooks, Dianne L. (1997). "Rape on Soaps: The Legal Angle". In Feminism, Media, and the Law, Martha Fineman & Martha T. McCluskey, eds. New York: Oxford University Press, pp. 104–119. 
 Dutta, Mary Buhl (Spring 1999). "Taming the Victim: Rape in Soap Opera". Journal of Popular Film & Television 27 (1): 34–39
 Hayward, Jennifer (1997). Consuming Pleasures: Active Audiences and Serial Fictions from Dickens to Soap Opera. Lexington, Kentucky: The University Press of Kentucky.  
 Waggett, Gerry (2008). The One Life to Live 40th Anniversary Trivia Book: A Fun, Fact-Filled, Everything-You-Want-to-Know-Guide to Your Favorite Soap. New York: Hyperion Books. .

Television characters introduced in 1992
One Life to Live characters
General Hospital characters
Crossover characters in television
Adoptee characters in television
Fictional murderers
Fictional twins
Fictional newspaper publishers (people)
Fictional rapists
Fictional criminals in soap operas
Male characters in television
Fictional reporters
Male villains
Fictional identical twins
Fictional characters incorrectly presumed dead